{{Infobox person
| name               = Mohit Chauhan
| image              = Mohit Chauhan the actor's profile picture.jpg
| caption            = Mohit Chauhan in Shillong filming the movie 'Shivam| birth_name         = Mohit Chauhan
| occupation         = Actor
| known_for          = Dhoom 2  Chak De! India  Zameen
}}

Mohit Chauhan is a Bollywood actor from India. He made his debut in Rohit Shetty's Zameen, but achieved fame in Chak De India (as Shahrukh’s friend Uttam Singh), he went on to do movies like Dil Kabaddi, Second Marriage Dot Com.

 Career 
Mohit became a very familiar face on everyday TV by doing extensive episodes of daily soap operas and informative shows like Crime Patrol, Rishta.com, Tera Mujh Se Hai Pehle Ka Nata Koi, Khote Sikke, Ek Hazaron Mein Meri Behna Hai and Sadda Haq for Channel V. He even played Raja Janak in Mahadev and played roles in other television series like Dehleez'', Naamkarann on Star Plus. 

Chauhan acted in a huge range of TVCs and made a huge stretch in the variety like Bingo Mad Angles, Tata Docomo, Rin, Dominos, Colgate, Sundrop Oil, ICICI Lombard, Aquaguard, Avantha Golf Masters, Bajaj water heaters, L&T General Insurance, Red Label natural care, Coke, and Star Sports.

Filmography

Films

Television

Web series

References

External links

Mohit Chauhan on The Review Monk

Living people
Indian male television actors
Indian male film actors
Year of birth missing (living people)